Newark Female Charitable Society (Newark Day Center) is a group of historic buildings at 305 Halsey Street and at 41 and 43 Hill Street in Newark, Essex County, New Jersey, United States.

The oldest and most significant building is 305 Halsey Street, a 3-story red brick and terra cotta building that was built in 1886  by the Newark Female Charitable Society and designed by R. H. Rowden.  It is "Victorian Eclectic in style with definite Romanesque features."  The Society was founded by the leading ladies of Newark in 1803, making it the oldest social organization in New Jersey and the third oldest in the United States.  The building at 41 Hill Street, adjacent to 305 Halsey, is a brick townhouse acquired by the Society in 1912 to house its expanding programs, although its maintenance proved expensive and it was sold by the Society in 1923. The two-story building next door at 43 Hill Street was constructed in 1977 as a medical and dental clinic.  The entire complex was added to the National Register of Historic Places in 1979.

The Society is now known as the Newark Day Center and functions as a community organization.  It still occupies 305 Halsey and 43 Hill, which together house a child development center, a senior center, and other programs that benefit Newark residents.

See also 
 National Register of Historic Places listings in Essex County, New Jersey

References

Clubhouses on the National Register of Historic Places in New Jersey
Cultural infrastructure completed in 1886
Buildings and structures in Newark, New Jersey
National Register of Historic Places in Newark, New Jersey